is a former Japanese football player.

Club statistics

References

External links

1986 births
Living people
Association football people from Osaka Prefecture
Japanese footballers
J1 League players
J2 League players
Japan Football League players
Albirex Niigata players
Thespakusatsu Gunma players
V-Varen Nagasaki players
Kamatamare Sanuki players
Association football defenders
People from Ibaraki, Osaka